The 1987 Afro-Asian Cup of Nations was the third edition of the Afro-Asian Cup of Nations, it was contested between South Korea, winners of the 1986 Asian Games, and Egypt, winners of the 1986 African Cup of Nations. The match was played in one leg on 6 January 1988 in Doha, Qatar.

Qualified teams

Match details

Winners
South Korea won on penalties 4–3 after 1–1 on final score.

References

External links
1987 Afro-Asian Cup of Nations - rsssf.com
1987 Afro-Asian Cup of Nations - angelfire.com

Afro-Asian Cup of Nations
Afro-Asian Cup of Nations
Afro-Asian Cup of Nations
Afro-Asian Cup of Nations
1987–88 in Egyptian football
Afro-Asian Cup of Nations
South Korea national football team matches
Egypt national football team matches
Afro-Asian Cup of Nations, 1987
International association football competitions hosted by Qatar
Afro-Asian Cup of Nations